Abu ʿAbd-Allāh al-Ḥusayn ibn Ḥamdān al-Jonbalānī al-Khaṣībī, died 969, was originally from a village called Jonbalā, between Kufa and Wasit in Iraq, which was the center of the Qarmatians. He was a member of a well-educated family with close ties to eleventh Twelver Imam Hasan al‐Askari and a scholar of the Islamic sect known as the Alawites or Nusayris, which is now present in Syria, Southern Turkey and Northern Lebanon.

For a time, al-Khaṣībī was imprisoned in Baghdad, due to accusations of being a Qarmatian. According to the Alawites, after settling in Aleppo, under the rule of the Shia Hamdanid dynasty, he gained the support and aid of its ruler, Sayf al-Dawla, in spreading his teachings. He later dedicated his book Kitab al‐Hidaya al‐Kubra to his patron. He died in Aleppo and his tomb, which became a holy shrine, is inscribed with the name Shaykh Yabraq.

He taught several unique beliefs. One such belief was that Jesus was every one of the prophets from Adam to Muhammad, as well as other figures such as Socrates, Plato and some ancestors of Muhammad. Similarly, other historical figures were the incarnations of Ali and Salman al‐Farisi.

He and his works were praised by the influential Iranian Shiʿite scholar Muhammad Baqir Majlisi.

Exposure to Nusayri doctrine

Al-Khasibi's first exposure to the teachings of Ibn Nusayr was through ʿAbdallāh al-Jannān, who was a student of Muḥammad ibn Jundab, who was a student of Nusayr himself. Having been initiated into the doctrine through al-Jannān, Khasibi was now al-Jannān's "spiritual son". With the death of al-Jannān, however, al-Khasibi had no means of continuing practice and study of the doctrine. This period of dryness ended later when he encountered an ʿAlī ibn Aḥmad, who claimed to be a direct disciple of Nusayr.

In this manner, al-Khasibi received transmission from both al-Jannān and ʿAlī ibn Aḥmad, thus continuing transmission of the Nusayri doctrine. Khasibi did not necessarily believe he was representative of a splinter, rebel group of the Shias, but rather believed he held the true doctrine of the Shias.

During his reign, the founder of the Alawite sect, al-Khasibi, benefited from Sayf al-Dawla's patronage. Al-Khasibi turned Aleppo into the stable centre of his new sect, and sent preachers from there as far as Persia and Egypt with his teachings. His main theological work, Kitab al-Hidaya al-Kubra, was dedicated to his Hamdanid patron. Sayf al-Dawla's active promotion of Shi'ism began a process whereby Syria came to host a large Shi'a population by the 12th century.

See also 

Ibn Nusayr

References

Further reading

History of the Alawites
10th-century deaths
10th-century scholars
Year of birth unknown
10th century in the Abbasid Caliphate
People from the Hamdanid emirate of Aleppo
10th-century Arabic writers
Sayf al-Dawla
Ghulat leaders